Jefferson Township is one of twelve townships in Adams County, Indiana. As of the 2020 census, its population was 1,363, up from 1,089 at the previous census.

According to the "2020 American Community Survey 5-Year Estimates", 33.9% of the township's population spoke only English, while 63.9 spoke an "other [than Spanish] Indo-European language" (basically Pennsylvania German/German).

Geography

Major highways

Cemeteries
The township contains the following cemeteries: Loofborrow, Rumple (also known as Cook- no longer exists), and St. Mary Catholic.

School districts
 South Adams Schools

Political districts
 Indiana's 6th congressional district
 State House District 79
 State Senate District 19

References
 
 United States Census Bureau 2007 TIGER/Line Shapefiles
 United States National Atlas

External links
 Indiana Township Association
 United Township Association of Indiana

Townships in Adams County, Indiana
Townships in Indiana